Scuttle's Scooters is an attraction at Mermaid Lagoon of Tokyo DisneySea at the Tokyo Disney Resort in Urayasu, Chiba, Japan. It is a Caterpillar ride-based type. It opened together with the park on September 4, 2001. Scuttle from Disney's The Little Mermaid hosts the ride. Guests ride on cars called "scooters" which rotates 180-degrees.

The attraction is similar to Slinky Dog Zigzag Spin, an attraction located at Walt Disney Studios Park in France and at Hong Kong Disneyland in Hong Kong.

See also
 Mermaid Lagoon
 List of Tokyo DisneySea attractions

External links
 Scuttle's Scooters at Tokyo DisneySea

Tokyo DisneySea
Mermaid Lagoon (Tokyo DisneySea)
Amusement rides introduced in 2001
2001 establishments in Japan